Latabryna is a genus of beetle in the family Cerambycidae. Its only species is Latabryna arnaudi. It was described by Hüdepohl in 1990.

References

Pteropliini
Beetles described in 1990